is a railway station on the Okinawa Urban Monorail (Yui Rail) located in Naha, Okinawa Prefecture, Japan. The station was originally planned to be named  after the neighborhood within Shuri, but opened as Shuri Station on August 10, 2003. It serves the center of downtown Shuri, Shuri Castle, and its environs.

Shuri Station was originally the eastern terminus of the line.

The chime played to announce trains' arrival and departure is the traditional Okinawan nursery rhyme Akata Sunduchi.

Lines
Okinawa Urban Monorail

Adjacent stations

References

Railway stations in Japan opened in 2003
Railway stations in Okinawa Prefecture
Naha